NRK Nyheter is a Norwegian all-news radio channel operated by the Norwegian Broadcasting Corporation (NRK). It was launched on 14 April 1997 (as NRK Alltid nyheter) as part of an effort to attract listeners to DAB digital radio, and was the world's first all-digital news channel. 

Initially the station used the same production model as ABC NewsRadio in Sydney, Australia and broadcast news every fifteen minutes, in a less formal manner than traditional radio. It had its own staff of 16 journalists who created stories based on material provided by NRK's main news division, the BBC World Service, and Sveriges Radio. In 2002 the station moved to NRK's headquarters in Marienlyst, Oslo, where other NRK news output is produced.

Although the channel had been set up with the aim of attracting listeners to DAB, it was later decided that early DAB coverage was too low, and parallel broadcasting on FM was begun in 17 of the largest Norwegian cities and towns. These FM transmissions were withdrawn in line with the planned switch-off of analogue radio in Norway, which started in January 2017, now that DAB+ transmissions can be received by 99.7% of the population. By 13 December 2017 all NRK national stations had transitioned to DAB+ transmissions only.

In 2002 the station became part of NRK's news division. Alongside its own programmes, NRK Nyheter rebroadcasts programmes from other NRK stations and the audio from NRK's early-evening tv news programme Dagsrevyen. Overnight (from 22.00 to 6.30 on weekdays, longer at weekends) the station relays the BBC World Service in English. On weekdays NRK Nyheter also airs a special edition of Ekot – 15 minutes of news in Swedish from Sveriges Radio (30 minutes on Fridays) – and further BBC World Service content is rebroadcast as part of the daytime schedule at weekends. 

At the end of August 2018, NRK Alltid nyheter had a weekly reach of 82,000 listeners (an audience share of 1.8%).

In 2021, the station was renamed NRK Nyheter.

The channel is also available via satellite and online web services.

References

External links 
NRK Nyheter online radio

1997 establishments in Norway
News and talk radio stations
NRK
Radio stations established in 1997
Radio stations in Norway